Wesley: Spotlight is a comic based on the Angel television series, featuring the character of Wesley Wyndam-Pryce. This title, along with the others in IDW Publishing's Spotlight series, was collected in the Angel: Spotlight trade paperback.

Story description

Summary
An extreme legal measure in the form of a lethal venom strikes down Knox, the current object of Winifred Burkle's affections. Forced to make a choice between letting Knox die or saving his life, Wesley deals with his own affections for Fred and their ramifications.

Expanded overview
At Wolfram & Hart, Wesley and Fred, each immersed in their own work, literally bump into each other. They exchange extremely awkward small-talk until Fred breaks off to speak with Knox. This painful exchange is noted by a non-corporeal Spike, who emerges from a wall to tease Wesley. Wesley tells Spike that there is nothing between him and Fred, and that he simply wants what is best for her. Elsewhere in the Wolfram and Hart lobby, a delivery man approaches with a package for Gunn. Fred says that she'll sign for it, but Knox quickly intervenes, snatching the package away before Fred can touch it. Knox is immediately immobilized; his skin and clothing turn black and he falls to the floor.

In the lab, it is determined that Knox is still alive. As Wesley and Fred puzzle over what could have happened, Eve enters and says that it was a blood subpoena: a curse sent by a rival law firm to kill the lead lawyer on a particular case. She doesn't think there is a way to reverse it, and believes that Knox has about six hours to live. Fred believes she is to blame, because Knox had intervened to save her. Wesley promises to get to work finding a way to save Knox.

As Wesley strides down the hall, Spike reappears, speaking of Wesley's good fortune - by not acting, Wesley can ensure that his romantic competition is eliminated. Wesley calls Spike's suggestion "repugnant," but Spike stands by his statement. Gunn joins them in Wesley's office; he believes he has found the legal case most likely to have prompted the blood subpoena. He gives Wesley the address of the lawyer in question, and Wesley says he will take care of it himself.

Wesley arrives at the offices of Asherton Travis, Attorney at Law, with Spike tagging along. A receptionist asks if they have an appointment, and receives an axe through her computer monitor. Wesley says that he hopes Travis can squeeze him in. He bursts into Travis's office and states that Wolfram and Hart is under new management, and does not appreciate attacks on its personnel. He embeds his axe into Travis's desk just as Travis is reaching for a gun in his drawer. Travis stammers that he doesn't know how to undo the blood subpoena, but gives Wesley the address of the man who handles his "magic stuff."

On the way, Spike is still incredulous that Wesley is going to the trouble of saving Knox. Wesley asks Spike what he knows about love, and Spike responds that he gave up everything for love once, "and it hurts like hell." They arrive at their destination, a used book store. Wesley begins to introduce himself and Spike to the clerk, but gets no farther than, "we're from Wolfram &--" before the clerk casts a spell to cover his escape. As Wesley fumbles through the darkness, he is mystically tossed across the room. Spike approaches, and points out that the clerk's magic has no effect on his non-corporeal body. From behind Spike, Wesley fires his crossbow; the arrow passes right through Spike's chest and pierces the clerk's hand, nailing it to the wall. Wesley threatens the man, and is told to open the cashbox and take the green stone within. Placing the stone on Knox's wrist will undo the curse. Wesley takes the stone, and warns the clerk not to take any future assignments that involve Wolfram and Hart.

As Wesley and Spike return to the car, Wes notes that it has been five and a half hours since Knox collapsed. Spike points out that they would only have to delay slightly to "fail" their mission. Wesley glares at him, and Spike relents. They arrive at Wolfram and Hart, and Wesley applies the stone to Knox's wrist. Knox's body regains its proper color, and Fred thanks Wesley, embracing him. With a sad look on his face, Wesley says, "...you're welcome."

Wesley stares through a window into the lab, where Fred and Knox are sharing a happy moment. From behind him, Spike calls Wesley a "triumphant hero." Wes replies that he never claimed to be a hero. Spike asks if he's really willing to sacrifice his own happiness for Fred's, and Wesley says, "it's no sacrifice at all."

Writing and artwork

 Unlike most of the other Spotlight issues from IDW, Wesley's book has a title, seen on page 5: "No Sacrifice".
 Wesley's actions in this comic are somewhat ironic: he saves Knox to make Fred happy, but it is Knox who later plays a significant role in Fred's death in "A Hole in the World". Wesley later kills Knox himself in "Shells".
This comic would take place before the events of "Destiny", as Spike is still incorporeal.

Continuity

Canonical issues

Angel comics such as this one are not usually considered by fans as canonical. Some fans consider them stories from the imaginations of authors and artists, while other fans consider them as taking place in an alternative fictional reality. However unlike fan fiction, overviews summarising their story, written early in the writing process, were 'approved' by both Fox and Joss Whedon (or his office), and the books were therefore later published as officially Buffy merchandise.

External links
Ihatemike.com Mike Norton's web log - a sketch of Wesley, and the announcement that he is going to be drawing it.

References

Angel (1999 TV series) comics
One-shot comic titles